The Aqua Line 3 of the Mumbai Metro, also known as Colaba-Bandra-SEEPZ Line, is currently under construction in Mumbai, India. The line will run from Navy Nagar in the far-south of Mumbai to Aarey Depot in the north-centre, and will include connections to other metro lines, monorail, suburban rail, inter-city rail, and Mumbai Airport. Line 3 is expected to reduce road congestion, and to reduce the load on the Western Line between Bandra and Churchgate.

The project is being implemented, and will be operated, by the Mumbai Metro Rail Corporation Limited (MMRCL). The project is being funded by five major groups: MMRCL, Padeco, MMRDA, CREC, and JICA; the last of which provided a soft loan of 

One of the tunnels was completed in March 2020. This will be the second under-river metro rail tunnel in India after the tunnel underneath the Hooghly river on Kolkata Metro Line 2.

The construction of this metro route faced hurdles from environmentalists and activists lodging numerous PILs over cutting of trees in various region accompanied with a larger protest in Aarey over the carshed construction. PILs were either dismissed or didn't succeed as both the Supreme Court and the Maharashtra High Court cited the importance of the metro project.

Background
A  metro line from Colaba to Bandra was announced in January 2004, as part of a master plan unveiled by the Mumbai Metropolitan Region Development Authority (MMRDA). The MMRDA unveiled plans for an extended Colaba-Bandra-SEEPZ metro line in 2011. The MMRDA decided to extend the line to the Chatrapati Shivaji International Airport to increase ridership. The  Colaba-Bandra-SEEPZ line was estimated to cost , have 27 stations, and would be the city's first fully underground metro line. at Nariman Point, BKC, MIDC, SEEPZ, and elsewhere. According to the MMRDA, an underground metro will minimise land acquisition and disturbance to traffic during construction compared to an elevated metro.

The Mumbai Metro Rail Corporation Ltd (MMRC), registered under provisions of Company Act, 1956, was constituted as a fully owned company of the MMRDA on 30 April 2008, as per state government directives. On 27 February 2012, the Central Government gave in-principle approval to the plan for Line 3. In April 2012, the MMRDA announced plans to grant the MMRC increased management autonomy, in an effort to enhance the project's operational efficiency.

Funding
In early 2012, the MMRDA conducted talks with officials at Chhatrapati Shivaji International Airport (CSIA) to finance or construct the line's three stations at the airport and GVK SkyCity, a proposed nearby commercial development. Mumbai International Airport Limited (MIAL) agreed to bear the cost of constructing the three stations, which is expected to total 777 crore. According to MIAL's CEO, R.K. Jain, MIAL is willing to contribute to the metro's construction because of the potential increase in passenger convenience. MIAL estimated the cost of developing the metro lines in the airport as 518 crore.

In August 2012, the Urban Development Ministry rejected the Planning Commission's proposal to implement Line 3 in a public-private partnership (PPP) mode, having found the mode unsatisfactory for the Delhi Airport Metro Express. The ministry instead proposed a funding pattern with a ratio of 20:80 between the Centre and the State. Of the State equity, 45% was proposed to be through a loan from the Japan International Cooperation Agency (JICA).

In 2016, JICA commenced providing financial assistance for the project in the form of a soft loan through the MOUD (Ministry of urban development) as a "pass through assistance" at an annual rate of interest of 1.4% (interest free for monies given to consultants). JICA will fund 57.2% of the equity. The soft loan has an interest rate of 1.44%. The other finance will come from the central and state equity of 10.4% each, sub-debt by the central government (4.4%), sub-debt by the state (7%), property development and impact fee (4.3%), stakeholder contribution from the Mumbai International Airport Ltd. (3.4%) and MMRDA grant/aside funding (2.9%).

Planning
The Union Cabinet granted clearance to Line 3 on 27 June 2013. The Cabinet also decided to convert Mumbai Metro Rail Corporation (MMRC), the existing state-level special purpose vehicle formed to implement metro projects, into a joint venture company of the state and central governments with equity participation. The MMRC's board consists of five members each from state and central governments. The MMRDA presented their metro line plan to the Brihanmumbai Municipal Corporation on 13 February 2014.

Line 3 was approved by the state cabinet on 26 February 2014. Line 3 is being implemented through the engineering, procurement and construction (EPC) model. The foundation stone for the project was laid by Chief Minister Prithviraj Chavan in a bhoomi pujan ceremony at Andheri on 26 August 2014, in the presence of Union Urban Development minister Venkaiah Naidu. The move was described by the media as a cosmetic gesture, as the developers of the project had not yet been decided and actual construction was expected to begin only by December 2014. The date of the ceremony was a few days before the code of conduct for the 2014 State Assembly elections would come into force, which would prohibit the ruling Congress-NCP government from politicising the ceremony. Some citizens protested against the State government at the ground breaking site. They protested the slow implementation and cost escalation of the Mumbai Metro project. Tendering for the project was delayed by the re-organization of the MMRC from a wholly owned entity of the State Government, to a joint venture between the Union and State Governments. Although the State Government received the file for reconstituting the company in October 2013, it gave approval only in July 2014.

In December 2014, the MMRC appointed a consortium led by Hong Kong-based AECOM Asia, in a joint venture with Padeco, Japan, LBG Inc. USA and Egis Rail, France as the general consultants for the implementation of the Line 3 project. The agreement between the two parties was signed on 26 May 2015. On 6 July 2015, the MMRC unveiled a new logo, designed by Design Orb, for Line 3. UPS Madan, Director, MMRC and Metropolitan Commissioner, MMRDA, explained, "The earlier logo was designed with an elevated Metro-3 corridor in mind as was planned originally. The new logo presents the organisation more appropriately as its more relevant, fresh and robust". He also noted that the earlier logo had been designed while the MMRC was owned by the State Government, while it was now a joint venture between the State and the Centre.

The MMRC will have to rehabilitate 2,807 families for the project. Most of the families were relocated to Kurla and Chakala. The MMRC also provided free hotel accommodation to people residing in old, dilapidated buildings along the metro corridor that were in danger of collapsing during tunneling work. The majority of such buildings were located in the Girgaum-Kalbadevi belt in South Mumbai.

In March 2022, the Government of Maharashtra announced plans to extend Line 3 southbound from Cuffe Parade, adding one new station – Navy Nagar. In August 2022, the MMRCL invited bids for Detailed Project Reports (DPRs) for the extension.

Bidding
The MMRC called for pre-qualification bids in September 2013. Bidders for the work on tunnels and stations were to submit their bids by 30 October 2013. On 31 January 2014, the bid document was modified and the annual turnover requirement was reduced to "average annual construction turnover of not less than USD 175 million defined as billing for civil infrastructure work completed or in progress over the last five years ending on March 2013". Sanjay Sethi, managing director of MMRC, stated, "The annual turnover requirement must have been set with the idea of attracting specific companies to the project. However, the Japan International Cooperation Agency (JICA) felt that consortia or joint ventures are a combination of management contractors and construction contractors. In all Metro projects, the annual turnover is the starting point for bidding based on which we should not restrict applications. The issue was also raised by several potential bidders." The last date for the submission of pre-qualification bids was extended to 10 March 2014. Fourteen pre-qualification bids were received for the design and construction of underground stations and tunnels for Line 3. The 14 bidders were: Afcon-KMB, CEC-ITD Cementation India-TPL, CTCEC-Pan India Infrastructures Pvt Ltd, Dogus-Soma Constructions, IL&FS-CR256 (China Railway), JKumar-CRTG, Larsen & Toubro-STEC, Mosmetrostory-Hindustan Construction Company, OHL-SK Engineering & Construction, Pratibha-GDYT Consortium, Sacyr-CMC-Essar, Salin Impreglio-Gammon, Strabag-AG-Patel Engineering and Unity Infrastructure-IVRCL-CTG. Tenders to construct the car depot at Aarey colony were floated by the MMRC in July 2014.

Of the 14 consortia that submitted pre-qualification bids, 9 were shortlisted in September 2014. According to Sanjay Sethi, managing director of MMRC, "We have finalised the list of companies eligible for bidding after getting an approval from the Japan International Cooperation Agency (JICA), which is providing more than 50 per cent of funds for the project. The companies that were declared ineligible mostly fell short in technical experience. The tender floated by the MMRC received 31 bids from 9 consortiums. The first four packages received 4 bids each, while the next three packages received 5, 7 and 3 bids respectively. The 9 consortia were AFCONS Infrastructure Ltd. - Kyivmetrobud, Continental Engineering Corporation - ITD Cementation India Ltd - Tata Projects Ltd, DOGUS - SOMA, IL&FS Engineering and Construction Company Ltd - China Railway 25th Bureau Group Co.Ltd, J.Kumar Infraprojects Ltd - China Railway No.3 Engineering Group Co. Ltd, Larsen & Toubro Ltd/Shanghai Tunnel Engineering Co. Ltd, OSJC Moscow Metrostroy - Hindustan Construction Co.Ltd, Pratibha Industries Ltd - Guandong Yuantian Engineering Co., and Unity Infraprojects Ltd - IVRCL Ltd - China Railway Tunnel Group Co. Ltd.

Contracts for all seven packages were awarded by August 2016.

In January 2017, the MMRC floated tenders worth 328 crore for the construction of the depot, a metro station, work workshop buildings at Aarey Colony and a vehicular underpass along the Marol Maroshi Road, with other allied works. The contract was awarded to New Delhi-based Sam (India) Builtwell Pvt. Ltd. in June 2017. Construction is expected to be completed by mid-2020.

Environmental Damage & Safety issues

Green cover loss & harm to biodiversity 
The project will affect 5,012 trees, of which 1,331 will be cut and the remaining 3,681 will re-planted in other parts of the city. Per the terms of the contracts awarded to various consortia, they are in-charge of transplanting affected trees and planting new trees to make up for those cut down. The contract requires consortia to plant three times the number of trees cut down for the project, and maintain them for a period of at least 3 years. The consortium of Tata Projects, ITD Cementation and CEC Taiwan, which won the contract to construct the package 4, pledged to construct 4 times more trees than it was required to plant under the contract. The work on package 4, the section between Siddhivinayak Temple and Mahim, required the felling of 150 trees. The consortium pledged that it would plant 2,000 trees instead of the required 450.

On 28 February 2017, the MMRC announced that it would donate 25,000 saplings to housing societies, hospitals, and schools located along the metro line. The MMRC stated that the donation was in addition to compulsory tree plantation required by MCGM regulations. In January 2017, the MMRC hired arborist Simon Leong from Singapore to serve as a tree consultant on the project. Leong will provide his services for a six-month period at a rate of $33,000 per month. The MMRC donated 16,000 saplings at 25 different locations under its Project Neighbourhood initiative on 11 April 2017.

MMRC Director Ashwini Bhide criticized the controversy over the tree felling required for the project saying that infrastructure could not be built without cutting down trees. Bhide stated that the metro had been designed to minimize the loss of trees, and that 3 times more trees would be planted to make up for the loss. Bhide further explained that the 5,000 trees proposed to be cut for Metro 3 would reduce carbon dioxide by 6,100 kg, while reduction in vehicle usage as a result of Metro 3 would reduce carbon emissions by an estimated 9.9 million kg. Bhide also stated that the MMRC had considered building the depot at Kalina and Kanjurmarg but decided against it due to lack of availability of land and potential legal disputes involving land in the area.

On 4 October 2019 after Bombay High Court dismissed the petitions rejecting application for stay on tree cutting at Aarey in the morning,

Threat of flooding 
A technical expert committee appointed by the state had reported in May 2015 that if the car shed is built and the land in Aarey is concretised, the excess water during rains will run off into Mithi and flood the Airport and Chakala area since Aarey acts as a catchment area for the Mithi river. The experts, Dr Rakesh Kumar, director, National Environmental Engineering Institute (NEERI) and Dr. Shyam Asolekar, Professor at IIT-Bombay prepared a note on the same and submitted it to the Tree Authority before their meeting to take decision to give permission for felling of trees in September 2019.

Safety issues due to construction 
In September 2019, one man died and one injured in an accident in the tunnel shaft. This occurred between the SEEPZ station and the ramp near Aarey Forest (Prajapurpada & Sariput Nagar area).

In November 2019, a building (Laxmi Niwas) near the Sitladevi station, sank at least 6mm due to piling and soil excavation work. 25 families had to be evacuated and shifted to temporary shelters in hotels. Residents have suffered and have complained about the cracks that developed due to the construction work. Within one week of this incident, another building, Meher Manzil on LJ road in Mahim, also sank. Sea water has entered the foundation and corroded the pillars. Cracks had developed long before but the sinking of the foundation itself scared the residents and they moved out due to fear.

The 120 year old, grade-I heritage structure that serves as the Western Railway Headquarter was reported to be under threat in December 2019 from the regular underground blasts at the Oval Maidan site of the Metro. The employees have complained that the frequency of the blasts have increased and the building shakes like a mini earthquake. Architects expressed concern over safety measures and precautions taken by MMRCL.

Legal Issues

Bombay High Court case
On 9 February 2017, the Bombay High Court issued an interim order prohibiting the MMRDA from cutting trees for the project. The Court was hearing two PILs filed by Mina Verma and Pravin Jehangir. Verma's PIL concerned tree felling in Churchgate, Colaba and Cuffe Parade, and Jehangir challenged the use of public lands for construction of the line. On 10 March 2017, the Court ordered the MMRC to furnish documents proving that it had received necessary clearance from the MoEF to construct the proposed stations of Hutatma Chowk, Churchgate and Cuffe Parade, or documents to prove that no clearances were required. The order was in response to the petitioner's claim that the MoEF had rejected the MMRC's request to construct the 3 stations. The MMRC responded that no clearance was required to construct the stations. On 16 March, the Court issued a notice to the MoEF asking it to clarify whether it had granted clearance to the MMRC to construct nine stations. The petitioner had pointed out that all nine stations fell under the Coastal Regulatory Zones II and III. On 12 April, the MMRDA filed its reply to petition declaring that the State Environment Impact Assessment Authority (SIEAA) had granted it permission to construct stations in Coastal Regulation Zone (CRZ) areas. The court directed the MMRDA and MMRC to submit all relevant supporting documents by 24 April. On 3 May, the Bombay High Court declared that the metro was crucial to ease traffic congestion in Mumbai. However, the court reserved its stay on tree felling stating that it would consider "what is more important - life of a human being or the life of tree". On 5 May, the High Court vacated its stay on tree felling for Metro 3. The Court declared that Metro 3 would help improve the environment and the socio-economic conditions of the city. It also observed that a balance had to be found between environmental protection and development, and that taking a "harsh stand, which the petitioners want" would make it "impossible to conduct development work".

On 8 May, the petitioners filed a special leave petition (SLP) in the Supreme Court challenging the High Court ruling. On 15 May 2017, the Supreme Court issued a stay on tree felling for the project until 18 May.

Aarey land issue
In 2015, the state government announced plans to construct the metro depot, where metro coaches will be parked, on an 81-acre plot of land in Aarey Colony. Authorities also intended to construct a labour camp for construction workers and a centralised operation control centre for the entire Mumbai Metro network at Aarey Colony. The construction would require the felling of more than 2,000 trees in the area. Environmental groups Vanashakti and Aarey Conservation Group (ACG) filed a petition with the National Green Tribunal (NGT) in January 2015 requesting that the Aarey Colony be protected as a no-development zone. On 5 December 2016, the Union Environment Ministry issued a notification declaring the area up to 4 km from the boundary of the Sanjay Gandhi National Park to be an eco-sensitive zone. The notification excluded 165 hectares of land in Aarey, in order to permit the construction of Line 3. However, the notification declared that the exclusion was sub-ordinate to any orders from the judiciary or the NGT.

The NGT's Pune bench passed an order temporarily staying all construction activities in Aarey on 19 December 2016. On 5 January 2017, the NGT granted an exemption permitting the MMRC to construct a casting yard on a 3-hectare plot of land owned by the State Government in Aarey. A tribunal bench ordered the forest department to provide a detailed map of Aarey Colony, and to declare whether any portion of the region had been identified as forests. In 1997, as part of a Supreme Court directive, State Governments had prepared a detailed map of urban forest cover. The forest department failed to provide the details at the next hearing, and on 17 February 2017, the NGT extended its stay on all construction activities up to 17 March 2017. On 29 March, the state forest department informed the NGT that 1,279.74 ha of land at Aarey had been used for non-forest activities since 1949, and therefore "cannot be declared a forest land because it is not a forest". The department clarified that although 1,114.74 ha of land had been declared as an eco-sensitive zone (ESZ) by the Union environment ministry on 5 December 2016, the notification excluded the land given to the MMRC and certain other areas. The department also stated that it would submit a list of survey numbers identifying Aarey as a non-forest area at the NGT's next hearing on 10 April. At the hearing on 10 April, the forest department stated that it was unable to locate its report on Aarey that would help prove that it was not "forest land", and requested an extension. The request was denied by the NGT. On 24 April, the Tribunal ordered the additional solicitor general to appear before it on 3 May and clarify the MoEF's position on approval for Metro 3.

Due to the issues surrounding the land at Aarey, Larsen & Toubro and Shanghai Tunnel Engineering Co., the consortium that was awarded the seventh package to carry out construction on the MIDC-Aarey Depot section of the line, exited the contract. The MMRC stated that the appointment of a new contractor would escalate the project cost by an addition . The Court stated that it would determine if the cutting of nearly 5,000 trees for the project was necessary.

On 18 February 2017, Fadnavis directed the MMRDA to consider constructing the depot at Kanjurmarg or Kalina. A few weeks later, MMRC officials stated that the proposed depot could not be built at Mumbai University land in Kalina because the available area was too small. The MMRC insisted that the depot should be built at Aarey, but proposed a new design which would allow the depot to be construct on 25 hectares of land as compared to the 33 hectares required by the old design. The new design will reduce the number of trees to be cut by 1,000.

In March 2017, E. Sreedharan wrote to Chief Minister Fadnavis requesting him to ensure clearance for proposed metro depot at Aarey. Sreedharan wrote, "Metro projects are environmentally most friendly and setting up a carshed in Aarey is not going to be a threat either to the government or to the eco system. The main objection would be against cutting of trees, for which compensatory afforestation on a liberal scale can be insisted upon."

According reports in the media, the MMRC brought machinery to conduct soil testing work for constructing ramps in Aarey on 23 March. However, local business owners protested the work, alleging that the NGT had stayed all construction activities in Aarey. The MMRC stated that the stay only applied to construction of the car depot, and not the ramps. Due to the protests, contractors removed all machinery from the site on 25 March 2017. MMRC began soil testing at Aarey on 30 March 2017, under police protection. The work area was cordoned off and surrounded by 50 Mumbai Police personnel.

On 16 April 2019, the Supreme Court rejected a petition filed the Aarey Conservation Group, a non-government organisation, seeking an alternative site to construct the depot. The Court observed that the MMRC had already considered alternate options and deemed them unviable. A separate petition filed by the same NGO, which had been dismissed by the Bombay High Court in October 2018, is still pending before the Supreme Court. On 4 October 2019, Bombay High Court dismissed the petitions rejecting application for stay on tree cutting at Aarey in the morning. On 7 October 2019, the Supreme Court stayed the tree cutting and ordered to maintain status quo until further notice. On 29 November 2019 a day after Uddhav Thackeray became Chief Minister of Maharashtra, he put a stay on car shed work. Uddhav Thackeray then on 11 December 2019 appointed a committee to explore an alternative location for the shed. On 29 January 2020, the committee after studying suggested to lift the stay as they found no viable alternatives for car shed saying that MMRCL's arguments were valid.

In July 2022 when the new government came under the leadership of Eknath Shinde - Devendra Fadnavis the carshed was shifted back to Aarey as 25% work was already completed and Kanjurmarg was found not viable as it was very far from the metro line which could have led to higher cost and energy and also the ownership of the Kanjurmarg plot also led to disputes. Finally on 21 July the stay order for the construction was retracted by the government and the construction resumed. This delay and other issues like the COVID-19 pandemic resulted in high cost overruns in thousands of crores in rupees and also delayed the opening of the line by at least 2 years.

Construction

Agencies involved
Construction of the Colaba-Bandra-Seepz metro involves a number of large national and supra national entities and sub contractors. These sub contractors, mostly involved in the tunneling works and mostly joint ventures include L&T-STEC (A joint venture between Larsen & Toubro India and STEC a large Chinese infrastructure company based in Shanghai), CEC-ITD CEM-TPL, Dogus-Soma, HCC-MMS and J.Kumar-CRTG. More than 100 Sub contractors and third parties have been used for various construction and relocation works including tunneling, boring, diversion of pipelines, realty consultancy and land acquisition including

Tunnels
Two 5.85 metre diameter twin tunnels of 33.5 km each will be dug at a depth of 20–25 metres. Seventeen tunnel boring machines (TBMs), each weighing around 1400 tonnes and costing , will be used to dig tunnels and record 41 breakthroughs. The TBMs will be lowered through shafts or pits using a specialized crane. Pre-cast segments will be put on the tunnels' diameter to prevent cave ins, after the TBMs bore 1.2 metres. Tunnels will have to be dug through a mix of soil and basalt rock, and is expected to be difficult. TBMs can dig at an average rate of 8 metres per day through rock, and at a rate of 14 metres per day through soil. After TBMs bore through section, the metro tunnel will be lined with pre-cast concrete rings to strengthen the tunnels. Boring and placing rings occurs sequentially. For the entire Metro 3 corridor, around 40,000 concrete rings were cast in 65 moulds. Casting of the rings took place at six casting yards - four in Wadala, one each at Darga, and on the Jogeshwari-Vikhroli Link Road (JVLR). The first concrete ring was fabricated at a Wadala casting yard on 7 March 2017.

Underground construction will be carried out at an average depth of 15 to 25 meters. The Hutatma Chowk, Kalbadevi, Girgaum, Grant Road, Shitladevi, Santacruz and Marol Naka stations will be constructed by the New Austrian Tunnelling method, while the other 20 stations will be constructed by the cut-and-cover method. In the latter method, the ground is dug, the entire station constructed, and finally the top is covered. Underground utilities will have to be shifted to construct the line, as it is completely underground.

The section of the line between Bandra Kurla Complex and Dharavi stations includes a 170 metre long tunnel passing under the Mithi river. The underwater tunnel is located at a depth of 15–20 metres beneath the river bed. Authorities will also construct a stabling line at a depth of 12–13 meters below the river bed. The stabling line will extend up to BKC station, and will be used for stabling and reversing of trains.

The original deadline for the project was 2016, but it is currently expected to be completed in 2021. Construction work on the project began on 21 October 2016. The work has faced delays due to several legal disputes. In March 2017, MMRC officials stated that they were unable to proceed with full scale construction activities due to legal issues, and that contractors were currently carrying out other activities such as shifting utilities, geo-technical surveys, and fabricating pre-cast segments. Authorities began full scale construction activities on 18 May 2017.

The alignment of Metro 3 at Chira Bazar in Marine Lines runs parallel to a Parsi fire temple. The trust that manages the temple forbids the entry of non-Parsis into the temple. As a result, contractors were unable to the enter the temple premises to map the location and conduct a building condition survey before beginning construction of the line. The trust instead requested the MMRC to hire a Parsi engineer to carry out the necessary work in the temple premises. The MMRC officials accepted the request and stated that it would work with temple authorities to avoid offending any religious beliefs and sentiments. However, with only about 57,000 Parsis residing in Mumbai, the agency faced difficulty completing the task.

Tunneling work on the corridor is expected to begin by October 2017. An estimated 6 million cubic metres of rubble will be excavated during tunneling, which will be sent to quarries on the outskirts of Mumbai. The rubble includes basalt rock of good quality that can be re-used in construction. Initial plans called for the rubble to be used for the foundation of the Shiv Smarak monument, and the proposed Mumbai coastal road project, but delays associated with the monument have made this unlikely.

On 10 July 2018, the MMRDA announced that it had completed 5,100 metres of tunneling for the corridor within the first year since the project was initiated. Around 10 km of tunneling was completed by September 2018, and 20 km by February 2019. The MMRCL reported that 23.9 km of the 52 km tunnelling work had been completed by the end of March 2019, or about 45% of total tunnelling work. As of 17 Dec 2020, 91% of total tunneling work is complete.

On 19 March 2020, MMRCL announced that it has achieved its 27th breakthrough out of the planned 41 breakthroughs. The section between BKC and Dharavi also marks the First underwater tunnel across the Mithi River. Pending tunneling across the Mithi river between Dharavi and BKC was completed on 19 August 2020, marking 29th such breakthrough.

On 16 August 2019, Chief Minister Fadnavis revealed the model for the rolling stock for Line 3 and announced that the line would be called the Aqua Line as the exterior and interior of the train feature an aqua colour scheme. The first trial run of the metro line was flagged off Maharashtra Chief Minister Eknath Shinde and Deputy Chief Minister Devendra Fadnavis on the 3 km stretch between Sariput Nagar in Aarey Colony and Marol Naka stations on 30 August 2022.

Stations and interchange connections
There will be 27 stations on Line 3. Only the northern terminus, Aarey Depot, will be at grade. All the other 26 stations will be underground. Stations will be equipped with platform screen doors.

Under the original plan, there was to be no direct connectivity between the airport and the metro. Commuters would have been required to exit the underground stations, return to ground level and cross a road to reach the airport. Upon reviewing the plan, Chief Minister Fadnavis directed the MMRC to redesign the stations to provide direct access between the underground and the airport as well as the Mumbai Central railway station.

Interchanges
Passenger interchange facilities, connecting to other railway lines, will be provided at the following stations:
Churchgate (connects to the Western suburban railway line towards Virar and beyond);
Mumbai Central (connects to two lines: the Western suburban railway line towards Virar and beyond; also to the National Rail Network for travel to cities across India)
Mahalaxmi (connects to two lines: the Western suburban railway line and the Mumbai Monorail); 
CSMT (connects to three lines: the Central suburban line towards Thane and beyond; the Harbour suburban line towards Panvel via Vashi; and to the National Rail Network, because this is a major terminus for trains going to other cities across India); 
 (connects to Line-1 of Mumbai Metro which runs between Ghatkopar and Versova via this station, Marol)
 (connects to Line-2 of Mumbai Metro which runs between Dahisar and Mankhurd via this station, Bandra-Kurla Complex)

List of stations

Infrastructure
The car shed, where the metro coaches will be parked, was supposed to be built opposite SEEPZ on an 33 hectare (81-acre plot) in Aarey Colony. Maharashtra government cabinet has allotted a government plot in Kanjurmarg for the line and is set to share the car shed with Pink line of Mumbai Metro.

In March 2017, the MMRC floated tenders for multiple works on Metro 3 including the traction system, power supply, tunnel ventilation, signalling, train control, platform screen doors and telecommunication system. The contracts include the manufacturing, supply and installation of these systems.

Tenders for design, supply, installation, testing and commissioning of ballastless tracks for the underground section were floated by the MMRC in May 2017.

Rolling stock
The MMRC, a joint venture of the Government of India and the Government of Maharashtra invited bids to supply rolling stock for Metro 3 in December 2015. The process of procuring rolling stock was delayed due to a disagreement between the Central Government and JICA. The Centre wanted 75% of the total rolling stock procured for the line to be manufactured in India, as part of its Make in India program, even if the contract was awarded to a foreign company. However, JICA wanted the bid for rolling stock to have no restrictions. The MMRC argued that manufacturing rolling stock in India would reduce the cost of maintenance. The agency stated that although bids without restrictions would result in cheaper procurement cost for the rolling stock, the subsequent cost of importing spare parts would be expensive. Under pressure from the NITI Aayog, the Department of Economic Affairs, and the Ministry of Urban Development, JICA agreed to accept the Union Government's domestic manufacturing requirement for rolling stock for all JICA-funded metro systems in India. As a result, the winning bidder may only manufacture a maximum 25% metro cars required for Metro 3 outside India. The MMRC rejected criticism that the restrictions would favour BEML, Bombardier and Alstom, the only companies that manufacture rolling stock in India, by stating that a foreign company that won the bid could sub-contract to an India-based manufacturer.

The MMRC restarted the bidding process, under the new conditions, in May 2017. The agency sought to procure 31 eight-car train sets. Each coach is 22.6 metres long and 3.2 metres wide. The MMRC received pre-qualification bids from seven firms - Alstom Transport India Ltd India & Alstom Transport S.A France (Consortium), CAF S.A, Spain, CRRC Nanjing, CRRC Changchun & CRRC International Corporation Ltd China (Consortium), Hitachi Ltd (Japan), Kawasaki Heavy Industries Japan & BHEL (Consortium) India, and Mitsubishi Corporation, Japan.

In September 2018, the MMRC awarded a EUR 315 million contract to French transportation major Alstom Transport and its Indian subsidiary to supply 336 coaches for Metro 3. The contractor will be responsible for the design, manufacture, supply, installation, testing and commissioning of 42 train sets of eight cars each. The trains will have a carrying capacity of 3,000 passengers and a seating capacity of around 300 passengers in each coach in longitudinal seating arrangements. All coaches will be designed and developed at Alstom's engineering centre in Bangalore, and manufactured by the company's plant in Sri City, Andhra Pradesh.

Metro 3 will be driverless. The line has an automation level of grade 4. However, the line will employ drivers during its first year in operation. Trains on the line will also utilize a time-interval system which allows them to maintain the minimum possible distance required for safety between each other. As all trains are connected with the operation control centre, every train is aware of the speed and distance of all other trains.

Signalling
Metro 3 will utilise the Alstom Urbalis 400 communications-based train control (CBTC) signalling system. There are no signals on the line, and speed and distance between the trains is monitored by onboard computers that are connected with a central computer in the operations control centre.

Power
MMRDA joint project director Dilip Kawathkar stated that AC power was chosen for Line 3 "after a proper study by a team of experts" which found that the AC model was "a better option". Experts believe that the decision to use AC escalated the project cost by 15%, since more digging is required for the rail to work on AC.

Operations
Despite providing connectivity to Mumbai's airport, passengers on Metro 3 will not be permitted to carry their check-in luggage onboard trains. Only hand/cabin baggage will be allowed. MMRC officials stated that Metro 3 was not an "Airport Express line", but a regular city metro corridor. Officials explained that providing luggage check-in would require additional dwell time at the Airport metro station, which would increase the overall headway of the line, and disrupt services for other passengers.

Fare collection
Metro 3 will utilize an open loop automated fare collection system. Passengers will be able to pay for travel using contactless pre-paid and post-paid smart cards issued by partnering banks. Only RuPay debit and credit cards will be accepted on Metro 3.

In March 2017, the MMRC held a pre-bid meeting with all pre-qualified bidders for the "Design, Manufacture, Supply, Installation, Testing and Commissioning of Tunnel Ventilation & Environmental Control System." In the same month, the agency received 12 bids from consortia to set up an automatic fare collection system.

In March 2020, MMRC expressed its displeasure over Tata Power's revised electricity tariffs and announced it could result in higher fares for passengers when the line opens.

References

Mumbai Metro lines
Airport rail links in India
Japan International Cooperation Agency